Carex myosuroides (syn. Kobresia myosuroides), the mouse-tail bog sedge, is a species of sedge (family Cyperaceae) with a circumboreal distribution. It is the only known sedge to have ectomycorrhizal associations.

It is a known host to a number of fungi, including Anthracoidea elynae, Arthrinium puccinioides, Cladosporium herbarum, Clathrospora elynae, Lophodermium caricinum, Phaeosphaeria herpotrichoides, Schizonella melanogramma, Septoria punctoidea and possibly to Micropeziza cornea.

References

myosuroides
Flora of North America
Flora of Europe
Flora of Asia
Plants described in 1779